Herbert Franke (27 September 1914 – 10 June 2011) was a German historian of China. He is particularly known for his works on the history of the Jurchen (Jin) and Mongol (Yuan) empires in China.

After the end of World War II, Herbert Franke, along with Wolfgang Bauer, was instrumental in establishing the Sinological Section in the University of Munich. Later, he succeeded Erich Haenisch as the head of the Sinology Department at that university.

He is one of the authors of volume 6 of The Cambridge History of China dealing with the history of China under the Khitan, Jurchen and Mongol regimes.

Works

References

External links

Historians of China
20th-century German historians
1914 births
2011 deaths
Officers Crosses of the Order of Merit of the Federal Republic of Germany
German sinologists
German male non-fiction writers